Kongklai AnnyMuayThai (ก้องไกล เอ็นนี่มวยไทย) is a Thai Muay Thai fighter.

Career

During  2019, Kongklai engaged in the 30th annual Isuzu Cup Tournament at Siam Omnoi Stadium. He gained popularity due to multiple comeback wins and overall entertaining style.

On January 25, 2020 Kongklai once again rallied late to beat KingStar Rongrienkelakorat by decision and reach the Final of the Isuzu Cup.

On March 14 Kongklai won the Isuzu Cup 140lbs Tournament. He knocked out Prabsuk Siopal with an elbow in round 3 after having been knocked down in the same round. He received the grand prize of 1 million baht and a brand new Isuzu D-Max Pickup truck.

On September 10, 2020, in his first fight back from the Covid lockdown, Kongklai became the first and only fighter to have ever knocked out Stadium Champion Saeksan Or.Kwanmuang, a fighter known for his toughness. He won by 4th round knockout with a right cross in the Sor.Sommai Birthday event at Rajadamnern Stadium

Kongklai won the rematch a month later on October 10, when he took away Saeksan's 140lbs Siam Omnoi Stadium title by unanimous decision.

Kongklai faced Thai Fight star, Ratchasing Rongrienkelakorat in the Isuzu Cup Super Fight on November 28 when he knocked out Ratchasing with an elbow in the third round to earn himself a spot in the King's Cup.

On December 9, 2020 the Sports Authority of Thailand committee voted unanimously in favor of Kongklai for the Fighter of the Year award. He was the only fighter out of the five nominees to have gone undefeated in the year.

Titles and accomplishments
Thai Fight
 2020 Isuzu Cup Superfight -64kg Champion 
 2020 Thai Fight King's Cup -67kg Champion
Siam Omnoi Stadium 
 2020 Isuzu Cup Tournament 140 lbs Winner
 2020 Siam Omnoi Stadium 140 lbs Champion
Max Muay Thai
 2016 Max Muay Thai The Champion Tournament 140 lbs Winner
Awards
2020 Sports Authority of Thailand Fighter of the Year
2020 Wan Muay Thai Awards Fighter of the Year

Fight record

|-  style="background:#fbb;"
| 2023-02-17|| Loss ||align=left| Superball Tded99 || ONE Friday Fights 5, Lumpinee Stadium || Bangkok, Thailand || Decision (Unanimous)  || 3 ||3:00 
|-  style="background:#fbb;"
| 2023-01-07 || Loss ||align=left| Rambolek Tor.Yotha || Ruamponkon Samui: Samui Super Fight, Phetchbuncha Stadium|| Ko Samui, Thailand ||Decision || 5 || 3:00  
|-
|-  style="background:#fbb;"
| 2022-10-21 || Loss ||align=left| Antar Kacem || IPFC 6 || Vladivostok, Russia || KO (3 Knockdowns/punches)|| 1 || 1:10
|-  style="background:#cfc"
| 2022-10-01 || Win ||align=left| Rambolek Tor.Yotha  || Muay Thai Vithee TinThai + Kiatpetch || Buriram province, Thailand || Decision || 5 || 3:00
|-  style="background:#cfc"
| 2022-08-31 || Win ||align=left| Petchmanee Por.Lakboon || Muay Thai Palangmai, Rajadamnern Stadium || Bangkok, Thailand || Decision || 5 || 3:00
|-  style="background:#cfc"
| 2022-08-02 || Win ||align=left| Patakthep Pakbangkakaw || Birthday Pitaktham Super Fight || Songkhla province, Thailand || KO (Elbow)|| 4 ||2:00 
|-  style="background:#fbb"
| 2022-06-20 || Loss ||align=left| Kulabdam Sor.Jor.Piek-U-Thai  || U-Muay RuamJaiKonRakMuayThai + Palangmai, Rajadamnern Stadium || Bangkok, Thailand || Decision || 5 ||3:00 

|-  style="background:#fbb;"
| 2022-03-11|| Loss ||align=left| Sangmanee Sor.KafaeMuayThai || Pitaktham + Sor.Sommai + Palangmai || Songkhla province, Thailand || Decision || 5 || 3:00

|- style="background:#cfc;"
| 2021-12-19|| Win || align="left" | Alessandro Sara || THAI FIGHT Khao Aor, King Cup Welterweight tournament - Final || Phatthalung, Thailand || KO (Spinning backfist)|| 1 ||
|-
! style=background:white colspan=9 |

|- style="background:#cfc;"
| 2021-07-03|| Win || align="left" | Patrick Kellner || THAI FIGHT Strong || Pattaya, Thailand || KO (Left hook)|| 1 ||
|- style="background:#cfc;"
| 2021-04-25|| Win || align="left" | Timothy Kamal || THAI FIGHT DMHTT || Samut Sakhon, Thailand || KO (Left cross)|| 1 ||
|- style="background:#cfc;"
| 2021-04-03|| Win || align="left" | Sajad Sattari || Thai Fight Nan || Nan province, Thailand || KO (Punches) || 2 ||
|-  style="background:#cfc;"
| 2020-11-28|| Win ||align=left| Ratchasing Rongrienkelakorat || THAI FIGHT Pluak Daeng || Rayong, Thailand || KO (Left Elbow) || 3||
|-  style="background:#cfc;"
| 2020-10-10|| Win ||align=left| Saeksan Or. Kwanmuang || SuekJaoMuayThai, Siam Omnoi Stadium || Samut Sakhon, Thailand || Decision (Unanimous) || 5||3:00
|-
! style=background:white colspan=9 |
|-  style="background:#cfc;"
| 2020-09-10|| Win ||align=left| Saeksan Or. Kwanmuang || Sor.Sommai Birthday, Rajadamnern Stadium || Bangkok, Thailand || KO (Right Cross) || 4||
|-  style="background:#cfc;"
| 2020-03-14|| Win ||align=left| Prabsuk Siopal || SuekJaoMuayThai, Omnoi Stadium – Isuzu Cup Final  || Samut Sakhon, Thailand || KO (Elbow) || 3|| 
|-
! style=background:white colspan=9 |
|-  style="background:#cfc;"
| 2020-01-25|| Win ||align=left| KingStar Rongrienkelakorat || SuekJaoMuayThai, Omnoi Stadium – Isuzu Cup Semi Final  || Samut Sakhon, Thailand || Decision || 5|| 3:00
|-  style="background:#cfc;"
| 2019-11-09|| Win ||align=left| Taksila Chor.Hapayak || SuekJaoMuayThai, Omnoi Stadium – Isuzu Cup  || Samut Sakhon, Thailand || KO (Elbow)  || 3||
|-  style="background:#cfc;"
| 2019-10-05|| Win ||align=left| Mahadet P.K.Saenchaimuaythaigym || SuekJaoMuayThai, Omnoi Stadium – Isuzu Cup   || Samut Sakhon, Thailand || KO (Right hook) || 3||
|-  style="background:#cfc;"
| 2019-09-07|| Win ||align=left| Petchnarin Kluarae1T || SuekJaoMuayThai, Omnoi Stadium – Isuzu Cup  || Samut Sakhon, Thailand || KO (Left Cross)  || 3||
|-  style="background:#cfc;"
| 2019-07-06|| Win ||align=left| Prabsuk Siopal || Omnoi Stadium  || Samut Sakhon, Thailand || TKO (Low Kicks) || 3||
|-  style="background:#cfc;"
| 2019-06-11|| Win ||align=left| Kongnapa Sirimongkhol || Sangmorakot, Lumpinee Stadium  || Bangkok, Thailand || KO (Left Cross) || 3||
|-  style="background:#cfc;"
| 2019-04-05|| Win ||align=left| Thun Chantak || Bayon TV || Phnom Penh, Cambodia || KO (body kick) || 2 || 2:25
|-  style="background:#cfc;"
| 2019-01-11|| Win ||align=left| Phal Sophorn || Bayon TV || Phnom Penh, Cambodia || Decision || 5 || 3:00
|-  style="background:#cfc;"
| 2019-01-03|| Win ||align=left| NuerMek Khainuplasod ||   || Phitsanulok, Thailand || KO || 4||
|-  style="background:#cfc;"
| 2018-10-04|| Win ||align=left| Phetwanmai Chor.Chaphanthong||   || Thailand || Decision || 5|| 3:00
|-  style="background:#fbb;"
| 2018-06-03|| Loss||align=left| Kongklai Kaewsamrit || Muaydee Vitheethai, Blue Arena || Samut Prakan, Thailand || TKO|| 3||
|-  style="background:#cfc;"
| 2018-04-08|| Win ||align=left| Maneejedsaeng Sakvichian || Muaydee Vitheethai, Blue Arena || Samut Prakan, Thailand || Decision || 5|| 3:00
|-  style="background:#cfc;"
| 2018-02-25|| Win ||align=left| Kuchart Daengmorchit || Muaydee Vitheethai, Blue Arena || Samut Prakan, Thailand || KO || 3||
|-  style="background:#cfc;"
| 2018-01-15|| Win ||align=left| Raksurin Kesagym ||   || Thailand || Decision || 5|| 3:00
|-  style="background:#cfc;"
| 2017-12-24|| Win ||align=left| Muth Klem Kmao || Bayon TV || Phnom Penh, Cambodia || KO (body kicks) || 3 ||
|-  style="background:#fbb;"
| 2017-11-20|| Loss ||align=left| Petchartchai Lukchampachai ||   || Thailand || Decision || 5|| 3:00
|-  style="background:#cfc;"
| 2017-08-27|| Win ||align=left| Roeung Saroth || Bayon TV || Phnom Penh, Cambodia || TKO (arm injury) || 2 || 2:25
|-  style="background:#fbb;"
| 2017-03-26|| Loss ||align=left| Alex Grover || Max Muay Thai, Silver Belt Tournament Semi Final  || Pattaya, Thailand || TKO (Doctor Stoppage || 2||
|-  style="background:#cfc;"
| 2016-09-03|| Win ||align=left| Inseenoi Sharkiebox || Max Muay Thai, Final  || Pattaya, Thailand || Decision || 3|| 3:00
|-
! style=background:white colspan=9 |
|-  style="background:#cfc;"
| 2016-09-03|| Win ||align=left| Yodwichan Fairtex || Max Muay Thai, Semi Final  || Pattaya, Thailand || Decision || 3|| 3:00
|-  style="background:#fbb;"
| 2016-07-31|| Loss ||align=left| Shan Cangelosi || Max Muay Thai|| Pattaya, Thailand || Decision || 3|| 3:00
|-  style="background:#cfc;"
| 2015-03-20|| Win ||align=left| Saeksan Suphanburi ||  Lumpinee Stadium || Bangkok, Thailand || Decision || 5|| 3:00
|-
| colspan=9 | Legend:

References

Kongklai AnnyMuayThai
ONE Championship kickboxers 
Living people
1998 births
Kongklai AnnyMuayThai